Live in Bucharest: The Dangerous Tour is a live concert DVD by American recording artist Michael Jackson released on July 25, 2005. The DVD was previously included with The Ultimate Collection box set in 2004. The concert took place during Jackson's first leg on his Dangerous World Tour on October 1, 1992 at the Bucharest National Stadium, with a sold-out attendance of 90,000. It was the last night of the first leg of the tour. This concert is the first concert by Jackson that has been officially released on DVD in the United States, also released in Asia market on double Video CD. The other official releases by Michael Jackson is a VHS of his HIStory World Tour concert in Seoul, South Korea, and it was released only in South Korea in 1996, Live at Wembley July 16, 1988, which is the second leg of his Bad World Tour.

There are various versions of the footage of the same concert that exist. The first version was broadcast the next day by BBC; following Jackson's death, this version was rebroadcast on BNN/Ned3. All the footage in this version is from the Bucharest concert. The version that appears on the DVD was broadcast on HBO in 1992, which became the highest audience in the channel's history for a single broadcast
. This version, while mostly having footage of Jackson performing at the Bucharest Concert (some in alternate camera angles in comparison to the BBC version), also consisted of footage from concerts in other locations such as Munich, Copenhagen or London. Also missing were the "Brace Yourself" video introduction and the "We Are the World Interlude," which were included in the original BBC Telecast. The crowd screaming and intro before "Wanna Be Startin' Somethin'" is featured in Jackson's 2010 song "Behind the Mask".

Reception
The concert special set a record for HBO at the time, becoming the channel’s highest rated special.

The DVD has sold over three million copies worldwide.

Track listing

Personnel

Performers
 Michael Jackson – lead vocals, dance and choreographer
Dancers
 LaVelle Smith – choreographer and dancer
 Jamie King – dancer
 Evaldo Garcia – dancer
 Randy Allaire – dancer
 Damon Navandi – dancer
 Bruno "Taco" Falcon – dancer
 Michelle Berube – dancer
 Yoko Sumida – dancer

Musicians
 Greg Phillinganes – keyboards, synthesizers, musical director
 Kevin Dorsey – assistant musical director
 Brad Buxer – keyboards, synthesizers
 Ricky Lawson – drums, percussion
 Jennifer Batten – lead and rhythm guitar
 David Williams – lead and rhythm guitar
 Don Boyette – bass guitar, synth bass
Vocalists
 Dorian Holley – vocal director and backing vocals
 Kevin Dorsey – backing vocals
 Siedah Garrett – backing vocals, duet partner on "I Just Can't Stop Loving You"
 Darryl Phinnessee – backing vocals

Charts

Certifications

References

2005 video albums
Michael Jackson video albums
HBO network specials
Michael Jackson live albums
2005 live albums
Live video albums